Cläre Hunsdiecker (1903-1995) was a German Chemist who worked with her husband Heinz Hunsdiecker to improve a reaction of Alexander Borodin now known as the Hunsdiecker reaction. They received both US and German patents for the work.

Education 
Hunsdiecker earned her Ph.D. from the University of Cologne.

For many years it was not believed that a photographic image of Hunsdiecker was in existence. In 2020 an image was located by an undergraduate student at the University of Melbourne.

References

1903 births
1995 deaths
Place of birth missing
Place of death missing
20th-century German chemists
German women chemists
20th-century German women